The men's long jump event was part of the track and field athletics programme at the 1924 Summer Olympics. The competition was held on Tuesday, July 8, 1924. 34 long jumpers from 21 nations competed. The maximum number of athletes per nation was 4. The event was won by DeHart Hubbard of the United States, the nation's sixth title in the event (having not won only at the 1920 Games). Sverre Hansen won Norway's first long jump medal with the bronze.

Background

This was the seventh appearance of the event, which is one of 12 athletics events to have been held at every Summer Olympics. The only returning finalist from the 1920 Games was fifth-place finisher Erling Aastad of Norway. The favorite was DeHart Hubbard of the United States, the 1922–1924 AAU champion and winner of the U.S. Olympic trials.

Bulgaria, Ecuador, Estonia, Haiti, India, Japan, Mexico, and Poland each made their first appearance in the event. The United States appeared for the seventh time, the only nation to have long jumpers at each of the Games thus far.

Competition format

The 1924 format continued to use the two-round format used in 1900 and since 1908, with the six-man finals introduced in 1920 (though a tie for sixth led to seven jumpers advancing this time). Each jumper had three jumps in the qualifying round; finalists received an additional three jumps, with qualifying round jumps still counting if the final jumps were not better.

Records

These were the standing world and Olympic records (in metres) prior to this competition. Robert LeGendre, who did not compete in this event, set a new world record in the pentathlon contest one day earlier.

Schedule

Results

The best six long jumpers, all four groups counted together, qualified for the final. In this case seven competitors were allowed to participate in the final, because two jumpers tied in sixth place in the qualification. The jumping order and the jumping series are not available.

References

Sources
 Official Report
 

Men's long jump
Long jump at the Olympics